Mijnenlegger I was a planned minelayer for the Royal Netherlands Navy. However, before the ship could be completed the Japanese invaded the Dutch East Indies and as a result the ship was destroyed to prevent it from being captured. If the ship had been completed it would have been the largest and fastest minelayer of the RNN at the time.

Design and construction
Mijnenlegger I was ordered in 1941 at the Marine Etablissement te Soerabaja in the Dutch East Indies. The next year, in 1942, the ship was laid down.

Armament
As the ship was still in the early phase of being constructed it was not yet fully decided what kind of armament the minelayer would be equipped with.

Notes

Citations

References

Minelayers of the Royal Netherlands Navy
Ships built in the Dutch East Indies
Proposed ships of the Royal Netherlands Navy